Michael Francis Foley (born June 7, 1965) is an American actor, author, retired professional wrestler, and color commentator. He is currently signed to WWE under the company's Legends program, acting as a company ambassador.

Foley worked for many wrestling promotions, including the World Wrestling Federation (WWF, now WWE), World Championship Wrestling (WCW), Extreme Championship Wrestling (ECW), Total Nonstop Action Wrestling (TNA), and National Wrestling Alliance (NWA), as well as numerous promotions in Japan. He is widely regarded as one of the biggest stars of the Attitude Era and one of the greatest wrestlers in the history of WWE, and participated in the main event of WrestleMania in 1999 and 2000 (as a special guest referee in the former). He was inducted into the WWE Hall of Fame class of 2013.

Foley has wrestled under his real name and various personas. His main persona during his time in WCW and ECW from 1991 to 1996 was Cactus Jack, a dastardly, bloodthirsty and uncompromisingly physical brawler from Truth or Consequences, New Mexico, who wore cowboy boots and often used sharp metallic objects, such as barbed wire, thumbtacks, and trashcans. When Foley first appeared in the WWF in 1996, he debuted the persona known as Mankind, an eerie, masochist, mentally deranged lunatic who was masked and spent his spare time dwelling in mechanical rooms. The following year, Foley debuted Dude Love, a relaxed, fun-loving, jive-talking, tie-dyed shirt-wearing hippie. These personas were known as the "Three Faces of Foley", with Cactus Jack making his debut in the WWF also in 1997. All three characters appeared in the 1998 Royal Rumble, making Foley the only competitor to enter the same Royal Rumble match three times under different personas.

Foley is a four-time world champion (three WWF Championships and one TNA World Heavyweight Championship), an 11-time world tag team champion (eight WWF Tag Team Championships, two ECW World Tag Team Championships and one WCW World Tag Team Championship), a one-time TNA Legends Champion, and the inaugural WWF Hardcore Champion. Foley's Hell in a Cell match against The Undertaker is regarded as one of his most memorable and controversial matches and widely acknowledged as the greatest Hell in a Cell Match of all time. Foley's dedicated and physical style of wrestling led him to often participate in violent and brutal matches that involved him taking dangerous bumps and putting his body through a considerable physical toll, eventually earning him the moniker "The Hardcore Legend".

Early life 
Michael Francis Foley was born in Bloomington, Indiana, on June 7, 1965. He is of Irish descent, and has an older brother named John. Shortly after his birth, he moved with his family to the Long Island town of East Setauket, about 40 miles east of New York City, where he attended Ward Melville High School. At school, he wrestled and played lacrosse, and was a classmate and wrestling teammate of actor Kevin James. While a student at the State University of New York at Cortland, Foley hitchhiked to Madison Square Garden to see his favorite wrestler, Jimmy Snuka, in a steel cage match against Don Muraco. He has said that Snuka's flying body splash from the top of the cage inspired him to pursue a career in pro wrestling. He had a seat close to the front row and is visible in the video of the event.

Professional wrestling career

Training and early career (1983–1991) 
Foley formally trained at Dominic DeNucci's wrestling school in Freedom, Pennsylvania, driving several hours weekly from his college campus in Cortland, New York, and debuted in 1983. In addition to appearing on DeNucci's cards, Foley and several other students also took part in some squash matches as jobbers for WWF TV tapings of Prime Time Wrestling and Superstars of Wrestling, where Foley wrestled under the names Jack Foley and Nick Foley. In one of these matches (the second episode of Superstars), Foley and Les Thornton (another jobber) faced the British Bulldogs, during which the Dynamite Kid (who had a long earned reputation as a stiff worker in the ring) clotheslined Foley with such force that he was unable to eat solid food for several weeks. During these squash matches, Foley also faced other top-level talents at the time, such as Hercules Hernandez. His run would not last long, as he had not signed a contract with the promotion at the time. During this run, he was also billed from different hometowns and at different weights.

After several years of wrestling in the independent circuit, Foley began receiving offers from various regional promotions, including Bill Watts' Universal Wrestling Federation (UWF). He joined the Memphis-based Continental Wrestling Association (CWA) as Cactus Jack, where he teamed with Gary Young as part of the Stud Stable. Cactus and Young briefly held the CWA tag titles in late 1988. On November 20, Foley left CWA for Texas-based World Class Championship Wrestling.

In World Class Championship Wrestling (WCCW), Cactus Jack, billed as Cactus Jack Manson, was a major part of Skandor Akbar's stable. (The addition of "Manson" to Foley's name, due to its implied connection to Charles Manson, made him uncomfortable.) Foley also won several titles, including the company's light heavyweight and tag team titles before leaving the company, losing his last match to Eric Embry in nine seconds. He then briefly competed in Alabama's Continental Wrestling Federation before completing a brief stint with World Championship Wrestling. For much of his time there, he would team with jobbers. When the jobber would lose the match for the team, Cactus Jack would attack his partner, throw them out of the ring, and deliver his infamous ring apron flying elbow drop onto the concrete floor. One notable occasion he did this was in Gainesville, Georgia against the rising tag team of brothers Rick and Scott Steiner- two of the stiffest and toughest workers in wrestling at the time. Lead WCW booker Ric Flair, Sullivan, and other WCW executives were impressed with this to the point that they offered Foley a contract, and Foley finally found some financial stability after years of hardship. It was during this period that Foley was involved in a car accident that resulted in the loss of his two front teeth, adding to the distinctive look for which he is famous. Following the short stint with WCW, Foley then signed with Herb Abrams's Universal Wrestling Federation. In UWF, Foley teamed with Bob Orton to feud with Don Muraco, Sunny Beach, and Brian Blair.

He soon left UWF for Tri-State Wrestling (a forerunner to Extreme Championship Wrestling), whose high-impact and violent wrestling style fit Foley well. On May 18 in Philadelphia, he and Eddie Gilbert had a Barbed Wire match- a sight not often seen in professional wrestling in the United States, and an object Foley would often be associated with. Barbed wire would be wrapped with the ropes all around the ring, and Cactus and Gilbert both bled heavily and the match ended when Gilbert threw Cactus into the ring ropes and he did a hangman—a planned move where a wrestler's head is tangled between the top two ring ropes- only this time his head was tangled with the ring ropes and barbed wire. Later that year, on one night, an event known as Tri-State's Summer Sizzler 1991, Cactus Jack and Eddie Gilbert had three matches in one night: Cactus won a Falls Count Anywhere match, lost a Stretcher match, and then fought to a double disqualification in a Steel Cage match. These matches caught the attention of World Championship Wrestling promoters, in large part due to widespread photo circulation. In 1991, after a brief stint working in the Global Wrestling Federation, Foley joined WCW full-time.

World Championship Wrestling (1991–1994)

Early years (1991–1993) 
On September 5, 1991, Cactus Jack debuted as a heel and attacked Sting. After feuds with Van Hammer and Abdullah the Butcher, Cactus Jack faced Sting, then WCW World Heavyweight Champion, in a non-title Falls Count Anywhere match at Beach Blast in 1992, which Sting won. For a long time, Foley considered this the best match he ever worked. Unlike Jack's first stint in WCW, where his personality was quieter, he was now outwardly maniacal; laughing hysterically, shrieking into the air while choking his opponents and yelling his signature catchphrase "Bang-Bang!".

After spending a year and a half with WCW as a heel, Cactus Jack transitioned into a fan favorite after engaging in a feud with Paul Orndorff, Harley Race, and Big Van Vader. Jack and Orndorff wrestled each other in a match for a spot on WCW World Heavyweight Champion Vader's team at Clash of the Champions XXII. After the match, Race and Orndorff beat up Jack. At the following Clash of Champions event, Cactus Jack helped Sting's team win the match. He engaged in a feud with Orndorff, winning a falls-count-anywhere match against Orndorff at SuperBrawl III. He then moved on to face Big Van Vader.

Feud with Vader (1993–1994) 
Cactus Jack wrestled Big Van Vader on April 6, 1993, winning by count-out, but being severely beaten in the process. Although talented and athletic, the 400 lb (180 kg) Vader was a notoriously stiff wrestler who had been trained in the Japanese "strong" style, and he hit so hard that most other wrestlers outright refused to work with him, out of fear of severe injury. However, Foley decided to continue his program with Vader, and as a result of Cactus's victory, in a rematch with Vader on April 24, the two executed a dangerous spot to sell a storyline injury. Harley Race removed the protective mats at ringside and Vader powerbombed Cactus onto the exposed concrete floor, causing a legitimate concussion and causing Foley to temporarily lose sensation in his left foot. While Foley was away, WCW ran an angle where Cactus Jack's absence was explained with a farcical comedy storyline in which he went crazy, was institutionalized, then escaped, and then developed amnesia. Foley had wanted the injury storyline to be serious and generate genuine sympathy for him before his return. The comedy vignettes that WCW produced instead were so bad that Foley jokes in Have a Nice Day that they were the brainchild of WCW executives who regarded a surefire moneymaking feud as a problem that needed to be solved. The angle was awarded "Most Disgusting Promotional Tactic" by the esteemed Wrestling Newsletter Observer.

In one of WCW's most violent and brutal matches of all time, Cactus Jack faced Vader in a Texas Deathmatch (a variation of a Last Man Standing match) at Halloween Havoc 1993 in New Orleans on October 24 after having a wheel being spun and the wheel stopping at this match choice. Race won the match for Vader by using a stun gun on Cactus, knocking him out. The level of violence and brutality involved in this match left the crowd and commentators Tony Schiavone and Jesse Ventura in stunned disbelief; both did not commentate much throughout the second half of the match. It also caused WCW, a promotion marketing itself as family friendly to refuse to book Cactus Jack against Vader on a pay-per-view again. On March 16, 1994, during a WCW European tour, Cactus and Big Van Vader had one of the most infamous matches in wrestling history in Munich, Germany. Cactus began a hangman, but neither wrestler was aware that the ring ropes had been drawn extra tight before the event, and Cactus could barely move. When Cactus finally freed himself from the ropes and fell out of the ring, his ears were badly split at the back. When Cactus re-entered the ring, the two wrestlers began trading blows. During this time, Vader reached up and grabbed Cactus's right ear, and ripped it off. The two men continued wrestling as the referee picked up the ear and gave it to the ring announcer. Vader claimed for years after that the ear had come off during the botched Hangman maneuver, however in a WWE Network video, Vader admits that after seeing footage that he had indeed removed Cactus's ear. Cactus and Kevin Sullivan were scheduled to win the tag team titles at Slamboree in 1994. Foley had to choose between reattaching his ear or wrestling in the pay-per-view and winning the titles. Foley chose to wrestle and won his only championship in WCW. Later on, Foley was frustrated by WCW and the company's new head Eric Bischoff's reluctance to work a storyline with Vader around losing his ear. This frustration turned into a realization for Foley- after being unable to see a positive or lucrative future for himself with Bischoff in charge, Foley decided not to renew his contract with WCW. Foley's last match for WCW was a violently brutal and chaotic tag-team Chicago Street Fight, where Cactus was paired with Maxx Payne against The Nasty Boys.

WCW also shared a brief co-promotion with ECW during this time in which Cactus represented WCW on ECW television as the WCW Tag Team champion, facing Sabu at Hostile City Showdown on June 24, 1994. During a promo, Foley spat on his Tag Team title belt and threw it to the ground to appeal to the hardcore fans who frowned upon the mainstream promotions.

Independent circuit and Japan (1994-1996)

NWA Eastern/Extreme Championship Wrestling and Smoky Mountain Wrestling (1994–1996) 
After leaving WCW, for the next 21 months Foley wrestled as Cactus Jack for various promotions in the United States and Japan, including Paul Heyman's Extreme Championship Wrestling (ECW), Jim Cornette's Smoky Mountain Wrestling (SMW) and IWA in Japan. After a brief 2-month stint in SMW, Foley began making trips between the United States and Japan in January 1995 and would mainly alternate wrestling in ECW and IWA for 14 months, doing a lot of work in both promotions with his mentor and friend Terry Funk. Foley also won championships on the Ozark Mountain and Steel City circuits.

Cactus Jack's first appearance for the NWA-affiliated Eastern Championship Wrestling came on the May 31, 1994, episode, with Cactus revealed as Sabu's opponent for June 24 at the ECW Arena in Philadelphia. After being part of a talent exchange between ECW & WCW, Foley brought his WCW World Tag Team Championship belt and spit on it for a recorded ECW TV segment. Foley continued with ECW and began a feud with Sabu. Foley then began working the ECW tag team division on teams with Terry Funk, Mikey Whipwreck, and Kevin Sullivan. Cactus had two ECW World Tag Team Championship reigns with Whipwreck while in ECW- while at the same time he was training the young Whipwreck.

At the tail end of 1994, Foley joined Jim Cornette's Smoky Mountain Wrestling (SMW) as Cactus Jack, causing Boo Bradley to lose the SMW Beat the Champ Television Championship. He often teamed with Brian Lee to feud with Bradley and Chris Candido. Cactus then began a crusade to rid Bradley of his valet Tamara Fytch. He ignited a feud between Candido and Bradley when he accused Candido of having sexual relations with Fytch. (Ironically, Candido and Fytch were a couple in real life). Cactus Jack left SMW before the feud was resolved.

Foley, however, soon returned to ECW to feud with The Sandman. Funk returned to team up with Sandman, and during a particularly violent spot, the pair hit Cactus Jack with a kendo stick forty-six times in a barbed wire rope match. Cactus then defeated Funk at Hostile City Showdown 1995. Later, he repeatedly fought Sandman for the ECW World Heavyweight Championship. During their match at Barbed Wire, Hoodies & Chokeslams, Cactus knocked Sandman unconscious and was declared the winner. Referee Bill Alfonso, however, reversed his decision because the title cannot change hands by knockout. Foley then continued to have a series of violent encounters with the Sandman while challenging him and claiming that he had never been beaten in a Falls Count Anywhere match. He then started to team with Tommy Dreamer. According to Heyman, the Hardcore style differentiated Foley from other traditional wrestlers, so in ECW, Foley was right at home. However, Foley did not enjoy working with Sandman, as Sandman was often intoxicated during matches and could not perform properly; drinking large amounts of beer and smoking cigarettes made up a large part of Sandman's overall gimmick.

But 1995 proved to be an interesting year for Foley, particularly during his time in ECW. Two incidents caused him to change his opinion of a promotion that most thought made him feel like he was at home. There was a sign in the front of the audience one night that said "Cane Dewey" (this was done with Foley's permission, when he didn't know what this meant, but later understood), a reference to using a Singapore cane on Foley's real-life eldest son, who was 3 years old then (Foley would sometimes mention his family in his promos), and then witnessing a botch in the opening match of Wrestlepalooza on August 5, 1995, where J.T. Smith did a dive, slipped off the ring apron and landed head-first on the concrete. Smith was so severely concussed that his head began swelling on the spot, and the audience's response to Smith's botch was "you f***ed up". These incidents angered the normally jovial Foley so much that he furiously cut several memorable and scathing promos during this period to channel his intense frustration and anger toward ECW fans, who he felt asked too much from him and the ECW roster. Foley then began a gimmick where he criticized hardcore wrestling and sought to renounce his status as a hardcore wrestling icon and used a slow and technical wrestling style as a way to punish the audience. He said that he was on a mission to save his partner from making the mistake of trying to please bloodthirsty fans.  Foley later admitted in an interview in 2015 that after Wrestlepalooza he became indifferent toward ECW and its fanbase.

The mismatched partnership between Cactus Jack and Dreamer lasted until Wrestlepalooza, when Cactus turned on Dreamer while they were teaming with The Pitbulls against Raven, Stevie Richards and The Dudley Brothers (Dudley Dudley and Big Dick Dudley). Cactus DDT'ed his partner and joined Raven's Nest, as he wished to serve Raven's "higher purpose". He remained one of Raven's top henchmen for the remainder of his time in ECW. On August 28, Cactus beat the previously undefeated 911. As part of Foley's heel gimmick, he began praising WWF and WCW on ECW television, which angered ECW fans. Their anger intensified once word began to spread that Foley was leaving to join the WWF (In Have a Nice Day, Foley recounted an incident where he asked an ECW roadie to sell T-shirts for him at an event held in a Queens, New York venue where he had been popular even as a heel; the man came back after being spat upon numerous times by angry fans, who made him fear for his life). Even when he tried to give sincere good-byes to the fans, Foley was met with chants of "You sold out" by the ECW fanbase everywhere he went. Cactus Jack was booked to face WWF hater Shane Douglas, who won after he handcuffed Cactus and then hit him with no fewer than ten consecutive chair shots, and when he put Jack into a figure four leglock, this allowed Mikey Whipwreck to get into the arena and land one last hard chair shot to Cactus's face, knocking him unconscious.

Foley's last ECW match was against Whipwreck on March 9, 1996, at Big Ass Extreme Bash, and he recounts that he was not looking forward to it due to the increasingly hostile reactions he got even when he wasn't in character. The ECW fans, who knew that this was Foley's last match, finally returned his affection. They cheered him throughout the match and chanted, "Please don't go!". After the match, Foley told the audience that their reaction made everything worthwhile and made his exit by dancing with Stevie Richards and The Blue Meanie to Frank Sinatra's song "New York, New York". Foley has said that this exit was his favorite moment in wrestling.

IWA Japan (1995–1996) 

In 1995, during his time in ECW and other promotions in the United States, Foley also went to Japan and wrestled in International Wrestling Association of Japan (IWA Japan), where he engaged in feuds with Terry Funk and Shoji Nakamaki. During his brief stint in Japan, Foley had the nickname "Tsunami Stopper." The level of violence and brutality in hardcore wrestling matches in Japan was at a much higher level than in Western promotions (except for ECW), something Western wrestlers were not accustomed to. Cactus faced Funk in a No Ropes Barbed Wire Scramble Bunkhouse Deathmatch at the Honjo Gymnasium in Saitama, just north of Tokyo in front of 150 people in a match that involved barbed wire as the ring ropes and objects set on fire. This turned out to be a particularly chaotic and brutal match where Foley and Funk mostly brawled in the seating area amongst the crowd, with folding chairs flying everywhere. After several brutal spots involving flaming chairs, flaming iron rods, Funk Hip-tossing Cactus into a flaming chair and Funk slamming Cactus's head into a wooden table, Funk reversed a Spinebuster by Cactus into a DDT and pinned him to win the match. In 2010 Foley wrote that, "looking back that match in Honjo is probably the performance I'm proudest of." Cactus Jack later began a feud with the chainsaw-wielding Leatherface, whom he had betrayed during a tag team match.

But perhaps the most notable matches of Foley's time in Japan were on August 20, 1995, where IWA organized a King of the Death Match tournament at their Kawasaki Dream event at the outdoor Kawasaki Stadium in its namesake city, which featured some of the bloodiest, most violent and most brutal matches of Foley's career. The tournament was seen live by tens of thousands of people, and each level of the tournament featured a new and deadly gimmick: Cactus Jack's first-round during the day was a barbed-wire baseball bat, thumbtack deathmatch, in which he defeated Terry Gordy; the second round was a barbed-wire board, bed of nails match where Cactus Jack defeated Shoji Nakamaki. At night against Terry Funk, the final was a barbed-wire rope, exploding barbed wire boards and exploding ring time bomb deathmatch, which Cactus Jack won with help from Tiger Jeet Singh. After the match, both men were covered in blood, ravaged by flesh cuts from the wire, and badly burned by the C4 explosions. Foley later said that he only received $300 for the entire night. After the tournament, Foley's right arm had second-degree burns from the C-4 explosions from the match with Funk and his arm smelt of explosive chemicals. After a 14-hour flight from Tokyo's Narita Airport to JFK Airport his father picked him up from the airport to take him back to his Long Island home, and immediately smelt something unusual. When Foley got home, his father and wife kept asking him about the awful smell, but he would not say anything, not wanting them to worry. After his father left, his wife persisted, so he revealed the burns to her.

Foley continued wrestling in Japan, Later on, he teamed with Tracy Smothers, Tiger Jeet Singh, The Headhunters and Bob Bargail for multiple runs at the IWA tag team titles, and a few runs at the IWA championship, where he challenged Tarzan Goto. True to his hardcore style, other matches Foley took part in were more deathmatches that involved objects like bricks, body bags, thumbtacks, barbed wire and window panes, and some matches even involved fire. He would continue wrestling in Japan until June 1996; the last notable match Foley had as Cactus Jack in Japan was a Caribbean Barbed Wire Barricade Glass Deathmatch against W*ING Kanemura, which Cactus won.

World Wrestling Federation (1996–2001)

Three faces of Foley (1996–1998) 

In 1996, at the persistence of Jim Ross, whom Foley had known in his days in WCW, WWF head Vince McMahon had Foley sign a contract with WWF, and this time it wasn't to use Foley as "enhancement talent".

McMahon was not a fan of Cactus Jack and wanted to cover up Foley's face, so he was shown several designs for a new heel character–a man with a leather mask and chains, called Mason the Mutilator. However, WWF decided that character as a whole was too dark and only kept the mask. Although interested in the concept of the character, Foley did not like the name, so he came up with the a new name , which McMahon liked and approved of.

Determined not to make this new character just "Cactus Jack with a mask and a different outfit", Foley arrived in the WWF in 1996 debuting a gimmick that was perhaps his most famous personality: "Mankind".

Mankind was an eerie and mentally deranged miscreant who dwelled in the mechanical/boiler rooms of buildings, constantly squealed (even throughout his matches), randomly shrieked "Mommy!" spoke to a rat named George, regularly took to acts of masochism (such as by pulling out his hair), and wore an mask seemily constructed of oddly shaped pieces of leather that were patched together with rivets.

Mankind's finishing move was the "Mandible Claw".
The move is based on the "Mandibular Nerve Pinch", a finishing move developed and utilized by former Osteopathic Doctor and Neurosurgeon-turned-wrestler, Dr. Sam Sheppard, D.O.. This finishing maneuver is a nerve hold that's applied when the aggressor plunges their middle and ring fingers into the opponent's mouth, under their tongue and into the soft tissue at the bottom of the mouth, while simultaneously forcing their jaw upwards with the thumb or palm of the same hand; clamping pressure is then applied between the fingers inside the mouth, and the thumb or palm under the jaw. If applied genuinely and correctly, it purportedly compresses the two nerves within the tissues of the mandible which render the opponent's jaw paralyzed, thus preventing the opponent from breaking the hold by biting the aggressing wrestler's fingers. It's proper application purportedly causes a significant amount of legitimate pain that's so intense it can inhibit the opponent's vision, and if applied long enough, can force the opponent to black-out.

His catchphrase, ever perplexing, was "Have a nice day!" and his association with boiler rooms led to his specialty match, dubbed the Boiler Room Brawl. This specialty match is chaotic and dangerous with significant violent use of weaponry all taking place inside an arena's mechanical/boiler room. Combatants involved made use of everything from foreign objects to all sorts of exposed metal piping with large bolts, concrete flooring to solid electrical equipment, all allowed by the match's no disqualification and no count-out rules. The objective of the match, in most cases, was to escape the boiler room first.

On the April 1, 1996, episode of Monday Night Raw in San Bernardino, California, the day after WrestleMania XII, Mankind debuted on TV and defeated Bob "Spark Plug" Holly, quickly moving into a feud with The Undertaker. The creatively inclined and dedicated Foley initially would prepare for playing Mankind by researching the character, often spending the night in the respective arena's boiler room and sometimes under the wrestling ring for the first few months, but after that he could get into character almost instantly. The two then began interfering in the other's matches until they were booked in the first-ever Boiler Room Brawl at SummerSlam, and in addition to escaping the arena's boiler room, the combatant also had to reach the ring and take the urn from Paul Bearer. After more than 20 minutes of brawling in the boiler room, the backstage corridors and the entrance ramp, and both men taking some bumps involving metal trash cans, tables, ladders, metal poles, hot coffee and the exposed concrete floor, The Undertaker appeared to have won, but Paul Bearer refused to hand him the urn, allowing Mankind to win, thus (for the time being) ending the relationship between Paul and The Undertaker. While Paul Bearer was Mankind's manager, Mankind referred to him as "Uncle Paul". Mankind then became the number one contender to face the then WWF Champion Shawn Michaels at In Your House: Mind Games. Michaels won by disqualification via interference by Vader and The Undertaker.

The Mankind and Undertaker rivalry continued with the first-ever Buried Alive match at In Your House: Buried Alive. Undertaker won the match, but Paul Bearer, the Executioner, Mankind and other heels attacked The Undertaker and buried him alive. Afterward, The Undertaker challenged Mankind to a match at Survivor Series, which the Undertaker won. The feud continued after another match at In Your House: Revenge of the Taker for the WWF World Heavyweight Championship, which Undertaker had won at WrestleMania 13. Undertaker won the match and Bearer took a leave of absence, continuing the feud. Jim Ross then began conducting a series of interviews with Mankind. During the interviews, Ross brought up the topic of Foley's home videos and the hippie-inspired character he played in them, Dude Love, as well as his tormented journey in wrestling. The interviews also affected the fans, who began cheering Mankind, even though he was still a heel at this point.

Around this time, Stone Cold Steve Austin and Shawn Michaels won the WWF Tag Team Championships from Owen Hart and The British Bulldog, but Michaels was injured and could no longer compete. Mankind tried to replace him, but Austin said he wanted "nothing to do with a freak" and resigned himself to facing Hart and the Bulldog alone the next week. Halfway into the match, however, Foley debuted a new face persona known as Dude Love, who helped Austin take the victory, becoming the new Tag Team Champions. Dude Love had some new and renamed moves, such as the "Love Handle" (a renamed Mandible Claw) and "Sweet Shin Music" (a simple kick to the shins, a play on Shawn Michaels's finishing move). Austin and Foley vacated their tag team titles when Austin suffered a neck injury in a match at SummerSlam in East Rutherford, New Jersey. Dude Love feuded with Hunter Hearst Helmsley, as the two competed in a Falls Count Anywhere match. One of Foley's most memorable vignettes aired before the match began, in which Dude Love and Mankind discussed who should wrestle the upcoming match. Eventually, "they" decided that it should be Cactus Jack, and Foley's old character made his WWF debut as a face. Cactus Jack won the match with a piledriver through a table.

In September 1997, Foley (as Mankind) wrestled Sabu at Terry Funk's WrestleFest, an event organized to mark the retirement of Foley's friend Terry Funk. Funk, however, broke his retirement soon after the event, and in December 1997, he joined the WWF as "Chainsaw Charlie", aligning himself with Foley.

At the 1998 Royal Rumble, Foley participated under all three personas, Cactus Jack (1st entry), Mankind (16th), and Dude Love (28th). Charlie and Cactus defeated the New Age Outlaws at WrestleMania XIV in a Dumpster match to win the tag team titles (which was originally supposed to be a barbed-wire rope match- but this often violent and bloody match was scrapped due to the high-profile appearance of Mike Tyson taking part at the event). The next night, however, Vince McMahon stripped them of the belts, citing that Charlie and Cactus had put the Outlaws in a random backstage dumpster and not the original dumpster brought ringside and scheduled a rematch in a steel cage, which the Outlaws won with help from their new allies, D-Generation X. On April 6, 1998, Foley turned heel when Cactus explained that the fans would not see him anymore because they did not appreciate him, and only cared about Stone Cold Steve Austin: after a hard-fought match with Terry Funk in Albany, fans started to leave the arena a minute or so before their match ended. Howard Finkel, the ring announcer there announced that Austin, who was the hottest wrestler in the WWE at the time would be making an appearance- and the crowd exploded at the news, and many rushed back to their seats. Foley later admitted that this crowd reaction emotionally hurt him, that his hard work could not compete with Austin's popularity and that he would be just another wrestler to face the company's megastar. Vince McMahon explained to Austin the next week that he would face a "mystery" opponent at Unforgiven. That opponent turned out to be Dude Love, who won the match by disqualification, meaning that Austin retained the title. McMahon, displeased with the outcome, required Foley to prove he deserved another shot at Austin's title with a number one contenders match against his former partner, Terry Funk. The match was both the WWF's first-ever "Hardcore match" and the first time that Foley wrestled under his name. Foley won, and after the match, a proud McMahon came out to Dude Love's music and presented Foley with the Dude Love costume. At Over the Edge, Dude Love took on Austin for the title. McMahon designated his subordinates Gerald Brisco and Pat Patterson as the timekeeper and ring announcer and made himself the special referee. However, the Undertaker came to ringside to ensure McMahon called the match fairly, and with his presence, Dude Love lost the match and was "fired" by McMahon on the June 1 episode of Raw.

On that same episode of Raw, Foley reverted to his Mankind character, who had become a more human and less creature-like character and began wearing an untucked shirt with a loose necktie, and also resumed his feud with The Undertaker. At King of the Ring in Pittsburgh's Civic Arena on June 28, the two performed in the third Hell in a Cell match, which became one of the most notable matches in professional wrestling history. Barely five minutes after the first bump, Foley, with a separated shoulder, climbed back up to the top of the Cell after Terry Funk and others tried to stop him. The second bump, which was an unplanned botch, occurred when The Undertaker chokeslammed Foley and the fenced panel Foley landed on broke and gave way. Foley then plunged  through the Cell and landed on the ring mat, losing a tooth in the process. Mankind lost the match to conclude their storyline.

WWF Champion (1998–2000) 

Following a couple of months of teaming with Kane who together won the WWF Tag Team Championship on two separate occasions and various feuds with Kane, Stone Cold Steve Austin, and The Undertaker, Foley decided that crowds might respond better if Mankind were more of a comedy character, and so he abandoned the tortured soul characteristics and became more of a goofy, broken down oaf. He began the transition into this character following SummerSlam in 1998 after Kane turned on him and the two lost the tag team championships.

The following month, Foley began an angle with Vince McMahon, with Mankind trying to be a friend to the hated Mr. McMahon. On the October 5 episode of Raw, while McMahon was in a hospital nursing wounds suffered at the hands of The Undertaker and Kane, Mankind arrived with a female clown called Yurple in an attempt to cheer him up. Having succeeded only in irritating McMahon, Mankind then took a filthy sock off his foot to create a sock puppet named "Mr. Socko". Intended to be a one-time joke and suggested by Al Snow, Socko became an overnight sensation. Mankind began putting the sock on his hand before applying his finisher, the Mandible Claw, stuffing a smelly sock in the mouths of opposing wrestlers. The sweat sock became massively popular with the fans, mainly because it was marketed (mostly by Jerry "The King" Lawler during the events) as being a dirty, smelly, sweaty, repulsive, and vile sock. McMahon manipulated Mankind, who saw the WWF owner as a father figure, into doing his bidding. McMahon created the WWF Hardcore Championship and awarded it to Mankind, making him the first-ever champion of the hardcore division. Mankind was then pushed as the favorite to win the WWF Championship at Survivor Series, as McMahon appeared to be manipulating the tournament so that Mankind would win. He and The Rock both reached the finals, where McMahon turned on Mankind. As The Rock placed Mankind in the Sharpshooter, McMahon ordered the timekeeper to ring the bell even though Mankind did not submit, a reference to the Montreal Screwjob from the year before. As a result of the Survivor Series, Mankind officially turned face, while The Rock turned heel and became the crown jewel in McMahon's new Corporation faction.

After weeks of trying to get his hands on McMahon's new faction, the Corporation, Mankind received a title shot against The Rock at Rock Bottom: In Your House. Mankind won the match by using his mandible claw hold (with the 'Mr. Socko' prop on his hand) and the referee declared The Rock had become unresponsive. But McMahon overruled the title change because Mankind didn't keep his pre-match promise to make The Rock submit. After several weeks of going after the Corporation, Mankind defeated The Rock to win his first WWF Championship on December 29 in Worcester, Massachusetts. The taped show was broadcast on January 4, 1999, so that is the date WWE recognizes as beginning the title run. Having title changes on broadcast television rather than pay-per-view was uncommon in professional wrestling, but because of the Monday Night Wars, television ratings became more important. The head of rival promotion WCW Eric Bischoff, attempting to take advantage of the fact that their show Monday Nitro aired live while Mankind's title victory was taped the week before, had announcer Tony Schiavone reveal the ending of the Mankind-Rock match before it aired. He then added sarcastically, "That's gonna put some butts in the seats." The move backfired for WCW, as Nielsen ratings showed that Raw won the ratings battle that night, despite the Hulk Hogan vs. Kevin Nash main event which led to the reformation of the New World Order. Foley said that the ratings indicate that large numbers of viewers switched from Nitro to Raw to see him win the title and took great personal pride from this- and WCW never beat the WWF in the television ratings ever again.

Mankind lost the WWF Championship to The Rock in an "I Quit" match (a type of submission match) at the Royal Rumble at the Arrowhead Pond in Anaheim, California near Los Angeles, in what is regarded as one of the company's most brutal matches. During the match, Foley took several violent and dangerous bumps from The Rock all over the arena, including repeated steel chair shots to the head and a fall from the stands onto solid electrical objects, which sparked upon impact. Although steel chair shots to the head were commonplace in the Attitude Era, the most a wrestler would take in a single ten-minute match was two, or sometimes three, with their hands in front of their head to ease the blow and lessen a chance of a concussion. However, Foley had taken eleven in the span of two and a half minutes, all unprotected, because he had been handcuffed just before The Rock began his repeated onslaught. Foley was originally supposed to take five chair shots to the head with the final match-ending shot being two-thirds up the entrance ramp; but, after the fifth shot, Foley was still at ringside and, even after Foley signaled to The Rock to hit him in the back, The Rock decided to keep to the match's brutal tone based on Foley's previous on-the-fly calling of similar shots on the spot, and he hit Foley six more times in the head until they got to the two-thirds mark. This match is featured in Barry Blaustein's documentary Beyond the Mat, which shows the impact the match had on Foley, his family and even the rest of the audience at ringside, and at one point Foley's wife Collette and five-year-old daughter Noelle both cried and screamed in horror, with Noelle believing her father was dying as The Rock pummeled Foley with repeated chair shots. The match at this point had become so brutal that some people in the audience sitting in the front furiously showed signs of disapproval at The Rock and shouted at him and the referee to stop the match. The match ended after Mankind lost consciousness, and The Rock's allies played a recording of Mankind saying "I Quit" from an earlier interview he did with Shane McMahon.

Mankind won the title back in a rematch on Halftime Heat, which aired during halftime of Super Bowl XXXIII, in the WWF's first-ever Empty Arena match in Tucson, Arizona on January 31. After 20 minutes of brawling in the ring, the empty grandstands, a kitchen, the arena's hallways, an office, and the catering hall, Mankind took a filthy sock off his foot and stuffed it into The Rock's mouth and then used a forklift to pin a subdued Rock in a basement loading area. The two then competed in a Last Man Standing match at St. Valentine's Day Massacre, which ended without a winner, meaning that Mankind retained the title. The next night, Mr. McMahon booked a ladder match for the championship, which The Rock won with help from The Big Show. Mankind would go on to WrestleMania XV to defeat The Big Show and again at Backlash a month later in a violent and brutal Boiler Room Brawl (the first in the WWF since July 1996), where the objective of the match had been simplified from the 1996 match to just escape the boiler room. Shortly after Big Show would team with Mankind, Test and Shamrock to take on the Corporation at Over The Edge. Later in the year, Foley and The Rock patched up their friendship and teamed up to form a comedy team called the Rock 'n' Sock Connection, becoming one of the most popular teams during that time. The pair won the tag team titles on three occasions. One notable match was a Buried Alive match that pitted the Rock 'n' Sock Connection against The Undertaker and The Big Show, who were out for revenge after losing the tag titles one week earlier. Foley then helped Raw achieve its highest ratings ever with a segment featuring himself (as Mankind) and The Rock. The "This Is Your Life" segment aired on September 27, 1999, and received an 8.4 rating, with Yurple the Clown making another appearance. Foley briefly reverted to his Cactus Jack persona for a Hardcore handicap match against Ministry of Darkness members Viscera and Mideon on May 10, 1999, which Cactus won; the match saw Cactus enter using two basketballs as weapons.

In August 1999, Foley returned after a three-month absence recovering from knee surgery to resume his feud with Triple H, who had kayfabe injured Foley's left knee with his sledgehammer. On an episode of Raw, Mankind drew with Triple H in a match for the number one contender for the WWF Championship, which resulted in a Triple Threat match between Steve Austin, Triple H and Mankind at SummerSlam for the title. Foley won the WWF Championship for the third time at SummerSlam, pinning the reigning champion Austin. Mankind's win led to an enraged Triple H to assault Austin, justifying Austin's absence while he healed a knee injury. The next night on Raw, Triple H defeated Mankind to win his first WWF championship. A feud then developed between Mankind and the McMahon-Helmsley regime, led by Triple H. This included Triple H defeating Mankind in another Boiler Room Brawl on the September 23 edition of SmackDown!, as part of a five-match "gauntlet" challenge set upon Triple H by Vince McMahon. It was around this time that Foley began to realize he was going to have to retire soon- in addition to the massive physical toll he had inflicted on his body, Foley then began to develop cognitive problems such as forgetting simple bodily motions and trouble remembering how to write and spell basic words. Foley's last match was supposed to be a tag team match with Al Snow in November 1999, but with the WWF having to go on with the absence of their biggest star Stone Cold Steve Austin at the time (who was out with a broken neck), Foley felt that the company would suffer too badly if another one of its biggest stars disappeared from the roster- even with The Rock surging in popularity. So Foley, even in the poor condition he was in, decided to go on for a few more months until Austin returned, and this is when he continued his feud with Triple H.

Mankind continued his feud with Triple H when he was supposed to have the last Boiler Room Brawl match with "Santa Claus". He ended up being attacked by the Mean Street Posse, Billy Gunn and Road Dogg, all dressed up as Santa Claus. Mankind defeated all 5 of these Santa Clauses until Triple H appeared as a 6th Santa Claus and brought down Mankind, escaping the Boiler Room and winning as "Santa Claus". On the December 27, 1999 episode of Raw, Mick Foley and the Rock had a "Pink Slip on a Pole match", where whoever was first to grab the pink slip first stayed in WWF with the loser having to leave, in which Foley lost. Foley then showed up as Mankind on the January 13, 2000 edition of SmackDown! and then reverted to his Cactus Jack persona in front of the crowd to promote Cactus Jack facing Triple H for the WWF Championship at Royal Rumble, in a Street Fight. Cactus used a 2x4 wrapped in barbed wire, and thumbtacks- trademark weapons from his pre-WWF days, but Triple H won the match after delivering two pedigrees, the second slamming Cactus face-first onto a pile of tacks. This feud culminated with a rematch at No Way Out in a Hell in a Cell match, where stipulations held that Cactus could not use foreign metallic objects he used in the Royal Rumble, and if he did not win the title, Foley had to retire from wrestling. During the match, they had made their way onto the top of the cell and Cactus was preparing to Piledrive Triple H onto a barbed wire 2x4 on fire, but Triple H reversed it into a backdrop, causing the cage to give way, and Cactus fell through the canvas. Triple H then pinned an exhausted Cactus for a three-count, winning the match and Foley's career was over. Foley left for a few weeks, but returned at the request of Linda McMahon to wrestle for the title by replacing Chris Jericho's spot at the main event of WrestleMania 2000 against Triple H, The Rock and Big Show. Triple H won, and Foley did not wrestle again for four years.

Commissioner and departure (2000–2001) 

After retiring from active competition, Foley served as storyline WWF Commissioner under his real name rather than one of his personas. Foley has said that he intended for his Commissioner Foley character to be a "role model for nerds," cracking lame jokes and making no attempt to appear tough or scary. He also had a knack during this time to have no one spot for his office; rather, Mick would have an office in all sorts of odd places (for example, closets). Foley turned getting cheap pops into something of a catchphrase, as he shamelessly declared at each WWF show that he was thrilled to be "right here in (whatever city in which he was performing (e.g., New York))!" punctuated with an intentionally cheesy thumbs-up gesture. During this time, Commissioner Foley engaged in rivalries with Kurt Angle, Edge and Christian, and Vince McMahon without actually wrestling them. He left the position in December 2000 after being "fired" onscreen by McMahon during which he received a brutal beat down.

Foley made a surprise return on the Raw just before WrestleMania X-Seven and announced that he would be the special guest referee in the match between Mr. McMahon and his son Shane at WrestleMania. After WrestleMania, Foley made sporadic appearances on WWF programming throughout the middle of the year, at one point introducing Minnesota Governor Jesse Ventura during a taping of Raw in the state as a foil to Mr. McMahon, as well as serving as the guest referee for the Earl Hebner versus Nick Patrick referee match and a tag-team bra and panties match between WWF wrestlers Lita and Trish Stratus vs. WCW wrestlers Stacy Keibler and Torrie Wilson at the Invasion pay-per-view. Foley returned as commissioner in October 2001, near the end of The Invasion angle. During this brief tenure, Foley had the opportunity to shoot on the WWF's direction and how dissatisfied he was with it. Saying that there were far too many championships in the company, he booked unification matches before the final pay-per-view of the storyline, Survivor Series. After Survivor Series, he ended his commissionership at Vince McMahon's request and left the company.

Ring of Honor (2004–2005) 

On September 11, 2004, Foley made his debut for Ring of Honor and cut a promo, praising ROH and referring to it as "Ring of Hardcore", thus establishing himself as a face. On October 15, Foley returned to ROH where he confronted Ricky Steamboat, who claimed that traditional wrestling was better than hardcore wrestling. During this confrontation Foley also cut a scathing promo on Ric Flair, as part of his real-life animosity over Flair referring to Foley as a "glorified stuntman" in his autobiography. The next day, both Foley and Steamboat cut promos on each other, leading to a match between two teams of wrestlers handpicked by both men, with Nigel McGuiness and Chad Collyer representing Steamboat and Dan Maff and B. J. Whitmer representing Foley, which was won by McGuiness and Collyer. On November 6, Foley teased a heel turn when he called ROH Champion Samoa Joe "softcore". On December 26 at ROH's Final Battle event, Foley returned to ROH and had his final confrontation with Ricky Steamboat, where the two made peace. On January 15, 2005, Foley turned heel after being confronted by Samoa Joe and hit Joe over the head with a steel chair. On February 19, Foley resumed his feud with Samoa Joe in ROH, teasing a return to the ring but instead choosing Vordell Walker to fight Joe. After Joe defeated Walker, Foley introduced his "backup plan" New Cactus Jack to fight Joe in a second match, which Joe won as well. On July 8, Foley returned to ROH as a face, confronting ROH Champion CM Punk, who had turned heel and mocked ROH and the championship after he had signed with WWE and threatened to take the title with him to WWE. Foley acted as a direct line to Vince McMahon, attempting to convince Punk to defend his title one last time on McMahon's orders before he departed from ROH. On August 20, Foley returned to ROH again, as a face, to rescue Jade Chung from Prince Nana. Foley was then attacked from behind by Alex Shelley and The Embassy until Austin Aries and Roderick Strong chased them off. Foley made his final regular appearance with ROH on September 17, when he was in A.J. Styles' corner in a match against Embassy member Jimmy Rave, which Styles won. Afterward, Foley spoke highly of Ring of Honor.

Return to WWE (2003–2008)

Various feuds (2003–2006)
Foley returned to WWE in June 2003 to referee the Hell in a Cell match between Triple H and Kevin Nash at Bad Blood. On June 23, during a Raw broadcast in Madison Square Garden, he was honored for his achievements in the ring and presented with the retired WWE Hardcore Championship belt. The evening ended with Foley taking a beating and kicked down a flight of stairs by Randy Orton and Ric Flair. In December 2003, Foley returned to replace Stone Cold Steve Austin as co-general manager of Raw. He soon grew tired of the day-to-day travel and left his full-time duties to write and spend time with his family. In the storyline, Foley was afraid to wrestle a match with WWE Intercontinental Champion Randy Orton on the December 15 episode of Raw and walked out of the match rather than face him, the result of the match was ruled a draw. After Foley walked backstage, Orton confronted him asking why he walked out of the match, calling him a coward in the process, before spitting in his face. Foley walked out of the arena afterward.

In 2004, Foley returned briefly to wrestling, competing in the Royal Rumble and eliminating both Orton and himself with his trademark Cactus Jack clothesline. He and The Rock reunited as the Rock 'n' Sock Connection and lost a handicap match to Evolution at WrestleMania XX. Foley and Orton continued to feud, culminating in a hardcore match for the WWE Intercontinental Championship at Backlash, where a thumbtack-covered Orton defeated Foley, as his Cactus Jack persona, to retain the title after hitting Foley with his signature move, the RKO onto a barbed-wire covered baseball bat. Foley regards this match as possibly the best of his career.

Foley appeared as a color commentator at WWE's ECW One Night Stand, which aired on June 12, 2005, and subsequently renewed his contract with WWE. Foley returned in 2005 in a match where fans were able to vote on which persona he would appear as—Mankind, Dude Love, or Cactus Jack—against Carlito at Taboo Tuesday. The fans voted for Mankind, who went on to win the match- this was the last time Foley ever wrestled as Mankind. On the February 16, 2006 episode of Raw, Foley returned to referee the WWE Championship match between Edge and John Cena. After Cena won, Edge attacked Foley, and the following week, Foley (who from now on would resemble Cactus Jack in his wrestling show appearances and matches, but would still wrestle under his own name) challenged Edge to a hardcore match at WrestleMania 22. In the intensely brutal match, the heavily bloodied and thumbtack-covered Edge defeated Foley after spearing him through a flaming table, where both performers suffered second-degree burns after anti-flame material was sweated off of both performers and was not applied to the flaming table, at their own request. In the weeks after the match, an "impressed" Foley turned heel and allied himself with Edge against the newly rejuvenated ECW. At ECW One Night Stand, Foley, Edge and Lita defeated Terry Funk, Tommy Dreamer and Beulah McGillicutty in a violent and brutal tag-team hardcore match, which included a spot where Funk hit Foley with a barbed wire 2x4 plank lit on fire, and the flame latched onto Foley, and he then fell onto a plywood board covered in more barbed wire.

Foley then engaged in a storyline rivalry with Ric Flair, inspired by real-life animosity between them. In Have a Nice Day!, Foley wrote that Flair was "every bit as bad on the booking side of things as he was great on the wrestling side of it." In response, Flair wrote in his autobiography that Foley was "a glorified stuntman" and that he was able to climb the ladder in the WWF only because he was friends with the bookers. The two had a backstage confrontation at a Raw event in December 2004 in Huntsville, Alabama, but Foley has said that they have largely reconciled. To spark the feud, Flair again called Foley a "glorified stuntman" and Foley called Flair a "washed-up piece of crap" and challenged him to a match. The result was a Two-out-of-Three Falls match at Vengeance, where Flair beat Foley in two straight falls. The two then wrestled in an intensely brutal and bloody "I Quit" hardcore match at SummerSlam in which Flair, who was covered in blood, thumbtacks and cuts from barbed wire won the match when he forced Foley to quit by threatening Melina with a barbed-wire bat. On the August 21 episode of Raw, Foley kissed Vince McMahon's buttocks as part of McMahon's "Kiss My Ass Club" gimmick after he threatened to fire Melina. Shortly thereafter, Melina betrayed Foley and announced that he was fired.

Sporadic appearances and SmackDown color commentator (2007–2008)
Seven months later, Foley returned to Raw as a face on March 5, 2007, with the storyline being that he tricked McMahon into giving him his job back. At Vengeance, Foley wrestled in a WWE Championship Challenge match involving WWE Champion John Cena, Randy Orton, King Booker, and Bobby Lashley. Cena retained by pinning Foley. A month later, Foley made an appearance on Raw as the special guest referee for a match between Jonathan Coachman and Mr. McMahon's storyline illegitimate son Hornswoggle. Foley then made an appearance on SmackDown the same week, where he defeated Coachman with Hornswoggle as the special guest referee. On the January 7, 2008 episode of Raw, Foley and his tag team partner Hornswoggle qualified for the Royal Rumble by defeating The Highlanders, but Foley was eliminated by Triple H during the Royal Rumble match.

Foley debuted as a color commentator for SmackDown alongside Michael Cole at Backlash in 2008, replacing Jonathan Coachman. On the edition of August 1 of SmackDown, Foley was kayfabe attacked by Edge during Edge's promo for his SummerSlam match against The Undertaker. Foley sat out the August 8 SmackDown to sell his recovery from the injuries. Tazz filled in for Foley as a color commentator on SmackDown, while Raw wrestler Matt Striker filled in for Tazz on ECW. Foley told Long Island Press pro wrestling columnist Josh Stewart in August 2008 that "creatively, the announcing job wasn't working out too well". He expanded with Dave Meltzer on the Observer radio show that the environment was creatively frustrating. Foley allowed his contract with WWE to expire on September 1, 2008, and quietly left the company.

Total Nonstop Action Wrestling (2008–2011)

Championship reigns (2008–2009) 

On September 3, 2008, Foley's agency, Gillespie Talent, issued a press release that stated Foley had signed a short-term deal with Total Nonstop Action Wrestling (TNA). Foley claimed in the statement to be "very excited about the specifics of this agreement and the potential it holds". Foley made his TNA debut on September 5, at a TNA house show giving a short speech about how he loved the product, in which he also belittled WWE. The official TNA Wrestling website featured an image of a smiley face with a variation of Foley's catchphrase, "Have a nice day!" (and, before No Surrender, "Have a nice Sunday!").

On the September 18, 2008 edition of Impact!, Foley made his first televised appearance for TNA, where Jeff Jarrett introduced him to the audience on the arena's video wall. Two weeks later, Foley made his full television debut in a promo making comments about the WWE roster, Vince McMahon and Kurt Angle. At Bound for Glory IV, he was the special guest enforcer for Jarrett and Angle's match. Later, on Impact!, Foley said goodbye, but was then approached by Jeff Jarrett with a new offer; he later indicated that they had come to terms on a new contract and would make a major announcement the next week. On the October 23 episode of Impact!, Foley announced that he was now co-owner of TNA along with Jarrett, just after Kurt Angle headbutted him.

On November 27, Thanksgiving Day, TNA presented the Turkey Bowl. Alex Shelley ended up being pinned by Rhino, and Foley handed Rhino the check. Afterward, the defeated Shelley had to put on a Turkey Suit in compliance with the match rules, albeit with much refusal. However, Shelley "flipped off" Foley and proceeded to beat him up. In the aftermath, Mick mentioned that Shelley is lucky he still has his job. The Main Event Mafia's Kevin Nash, Booker T, and Scott Steiner were going to take on Brother Devon, A.J. Styles, and Mick Foley in his debut matchup at Genesis. Nash, however, suffered a legitimate staph infection and missed Genesis. He was replaced by Cute Kip. Foley got the pin when he hit Scott Steiner with a double arm DDT onto a chair.

On April 19, 2009, at Lockdown, he defeated Sting to win the TNA World Heavyweight Championship for his first-ever championship in TNA, and his fourth World title overall. Mick did not lose the championship, but Sting became the new leader of the Main Event Mafia by pinning Kurt Angle at Sacrifice. Foley had also stated on Impact! tapings that if he retained the TNA World Heavyweight Title at the King of the Mountain match at Slammiversary, he would only put the title up in a match once a year. However, he lost the title to Kurt Angle in the King of The Mountain match at Slammiversary. He received a rematch at Victory Road, commenting he had only submitted once in his career (to Terry Funk, in a spinning toe hold) and swore he'd never do it again. He lost the match when Angle forced him to submit again with the ankle lock.

On July 30, 2009, in the 200th episode of Impact!, Foley won the TNA Legends Championship by pinning champion Kevin Nash in a tag team match where Nash teamed with Angle and Foley with Bobby Lashley. At Hard Justice, Nash defeated Foley to regain the title, following interference from Traci Brooks.

Various storylines (2009–2011; 2020) 
On the edition of September 24 of Impact! Foley turned heel when he attacked Abyss during and after a TNA World Tag Team Championship match against Booker T and Scott Steiner. Foley revealed Abyss as the one who tore up his picture and beat him to a bloody pulp with a videotape and the baseball bat wrapped in barbed wire. Abyss then challenged Foley to a Monster's Ball match which Foley accepted. At Bound for Glory, Abyss defeated Foley in the match. Two weeks later, Foley turned face by turning on Dr. Stevie and saved Abyss from him. The following week he explained that he had played Dr. Stevie all along and had challenged Abyss to a match at Bound for Glory to see how tough he was. On the edition of November 12 of Impact! Raven returned to TNA and saved Stevie's future in the company by costing Abyss a match and throwing a fireball in Foley's face.

After this, Foley turned his attention away from Abyss and Dr. Stevie and concentrated on Hulk Hogan's arrival in TNA, appearing to be paranoid about Hogan taking over TNA. On the edition of December 3 of Impact! Foley teased another heel turn by booking face Kurt Angle in a handicap match, after Angle refused to give him information on who Hogan is bringing to TNA. At Final Resolution, Abyss and Foley defeated Stevie and Raven in a "Foley's Funhouse" tag team match. On January 4, 2010, the day of Hulk Hogan's debut for TNA, Foley was assaulted by the reunited Kevin Nash, Scott Hall and Sean Waltman, when trying to get a meeting with Hogan. On the edition of January 21 of Impact! new Executive Producer Eric Bischoff fired Foley, after claiming to have been attacked by him. On the edition of February 11 of Impact!, Bischoff and Foley "talked it over", as Hogan had suggested two weeks prior, and Foley was entered in the 8 Card Stud Tournament at Against All Odds. The match was a No Disqualification match against Abyss, who won the match and advanced. On the edition of March 15 of Impact! Bischoff announced that he would be shaving Foley bald as a punishment for trying to help Jeff Jarrett in a handicap match the previous week. At first, Foley was seemingly going along with the plan, but at the last second he shoved Mr. Socko down Bischoff's throat, put him on the barber's chair and shaved him nearly bald. On the following edition of Impact!, Foley lost to Jarrett in a No Disqualification Career vs. Career match set up by Bischoff, forcing Foley to kayfabe leave TNA. In reality, Foley was taken off television due to him being on his way to exceed the maximum number of dates per year on his contract, at the pace he was making appearances.

Foley returned to TNA on July 12, 2010, at the tapings of the edition of July 15 of Impact!, leading an invasion of fellow ECW alumni TNA World Heavyweight Champion Rob Van Dam, Tommy Dreamer, Raven, Stevie Richards, Rhino, Brother Devon, Pat Kenney and Al Snow forming the team of EV 2.0. The following week, TNA president Dixie Carter agreed to give the ECW alumni their own reunion pay–per–view event, Hardcore Justice: The Last Stand, as a celebration of hardcore wrestling and a final farewell to the company. At the event Foley refereed a Final Showdown match between Tommy Dreamer and Raven. On the following edition of Impact!, the ECW alumni, known collectively as Extreme, Version 2.0 (EV 2.0), were assaulted by A.J. Styles, Kazarian, Robert Roode, James Storm, Douglas Williams and Matt Morgan of Ric Flair's  stable, who thought they didn't deserve to be in TNA. In August, Foley began writing a weekly column for TNA's website. On the October 7, 2010 live edition of Impact!, Foley defeated Ric Flair in a Last Man Standing match. the Last Man Standing match with Flair turned out to be Foley's last match in TNA. At Bound for Glory, Foley was in EV 2.0's corner, when Dreamer, Raven, Rhino, Richards and Sabu defeated  members Styles, Kazarian, Morgan, Roode and Storm in a Lethal Lockdown match. After not appearing for two months, Foley returned on the edition of December 23 of Impact!, confronting Fortune and Immortal. After Genesis, Foley once again disappeared from TNA television, but kept making regular appearances at TNA house shows. At the tapings of the edition of May 12 of Impact Wrestling, Foley made his return to television as he was revealed as the "Network" consultant, who had been causing problems for Immortal for the past months. On May 23, Foley, who had expressed frustration with TNA and said that he did not plan to renew his contract with the promotion once it would expire in the fall of 2011, made a joke on Twitter, comparing his Empty Arena match with The Rock to a TNA house show. On the following edition of Impact Wrestling on June 2, Hulk Hogan announced that Foley had been fired as the Network Executive. This was done to write Foley, who had asked for his release from TNA, off television. His departure from the promotion was confirmed on June 5, 2011.

On October 24, 2020, Foley made a brief return to Impact Wrestling at the 2020 Bound for Glory via video message to congratulate Ken Shamrock for his induction into the Impact Hall of Fame.

Second return to WWE (2011–present)

Last matches and final retirement (2011−2012) 

Foley returned to WWE at a house show in Dublin, Republic of Ireland, taking a break from his UK comedy tour, on November 2, 2011, making an in-ring promo with The Miz and R-Truth and then guest refereed the tag team match, appearing again in Manchester on November 5. Foley returned to Raw on November 14, which featured him presenting a "This Is Your Life" celebration for John Cena (he presented a similar segment for The Rock 12 years earlier). Among those brought out were Cena's former tag team partner Bull Buchanan, his former baseball coach (kayfabe), and his father; however the segment was interrupted by The Rock, who delivered a Rock Bottom to Foley before leaving the ring, ending the segment. Foley was the special guest host on the live edition of SmackDown on November 29.

Foley appeared on Raw on the January 16, 2012, episode to announce his intentions to participate in the Royal Rumble match at the 2012 Royal Rumble pay-per-view later in the night during a six-man tag team match CM Punk needing a tag Foley came down to the ring and got tagged in the match; he defeated David Otunga but John Laurinaitis reversed the decision because Foley was not an official participant of the match. The next week, he also appeared, wishing Zack Ryder good luck in his match against Kane that night. Foley participated in the Royal Rumble match at the 2012 Royal Rumble pay-per-view where he entered at number 7 and eliminated Justin Gabriel (with the help of Ricardo Rodriguez), Epico, and Primo, eventually being eliminated by Cody Rhodes after 6 minutes and 34 seconds. This was Foley's last night as an active wrestler. Foley later appeared in a segment alongside Santino Marella during WrestleMania XXVIII. On April 10, 2012, Foley made an appearance on WWE SmackDown: Blast from the Past. He returned to Raw on June 18, 2012, announcing that he would be serving as the temporary general manager of both Raw and SmackDown for the week. On July 23, at the 1000th episode of Raw, he appeared as Dude Love, danced with Brodus Clay and performed the mandible claw on Jack Swagger with a tie dyed Mr. Socko. In 2012, he hosted the WWE: Falls Count Anywhere – The Greatest Street Fights and other Out of Control Matches DVD. On the September 24, 2012 episode of Raw, Foley made an appearance to confront CM Punk, telling him to accept a match against John Cena. Later in the show, however, Punk attacked Foley backstage. At Hell in a Cell, CM Punk successfully retained his WWE Championship against Ryback due to interference from the referee, Brad Maddox. The next day on Raw, CM Punk announced he would be facing Team Foley at Survivor Series in a traditional Survivor Series Tag Team Elimination match for which Foley had accepted the challenge. However Punk had been removed from the match the following week. On the November 12, 2012 episode of Raw, Foley was appointed the Special Guest Enforcer in the match between CM Punk and John Cena. Foley's hand-picked Survivor Series team of The Miz, Randy Orton, Kofi Kingston and Team Hell No failed to defeat Team Ziggler in the Traditional 5-on-5 Survivor Series Elimination Tag Match. Foley portrayed Santa Claus on the December 24 pre-taped edition of Monday Night Raw. Foley as Santa was run over by Alberto Del Rio. However, he managed to recover later in the night and help Cena defeat Del Rio in a Miracle on 34th Street Fight.

In August 2012, Foley was originally scheduled to have a match with the debuting Dean Ambrose at SummerSlam. However, doctors could not medically clear Foley, so Foley announced his final retirement from in-ring competition.

Hall of Famer and various appearances (2013−2016) 
On January 11, 2013, WWE.com announced that Foley would be inducted into the WWE Hall of Fame class of 2013 by his longtime friend Terry Funk. The official announcement was made on the 20th Anniversary of Raw on January 14. At the February 26 taping of Saturday Morning Slam (that aired March 16), Foley was named as the new general manager for the show. He left the position in May 2013 when the show was canceled Foley returned on April 22 episode of Raw to confront Ryback until he was saved by John Cena. Foley appeared as part of the Extreme Rules post-show to provide an analysis. On the December 18 episode of Main Event he appeared As 'Foley Claus', helping The Miz defeat Curtis Axel. In April 2014, Foley didn't re-sign his Legends contract with WWE.

On the October 20, 2014 episode of Raw, Foley returned during a segment with Dean Ambrose and Seth Rollins where he discussed the cases of their match at Hell in a Cell. Throughout December 2014, Foley appeared in segments on Raw as Saint Mick alongside his daughter Noelle. In 2015, Foley appeared at SummerSlam, where he kicked off the event with host Jon Stewart. Foley returned to Raw on March 14, 2016, in a backstage segment with Dean Ambrose, in which he gave him a pep talk for his upcoming WrestleMania 32 match against Brock Lesnar and a passing of the torch in the form of his iconic barbed wire baseball bat, "Barbie". On April 3, 2016, at WrestleMania 32, Foley returned in-ring alongside Shawn Michaels and Stone Cold Steve Austin in a post-match interruption where the trio of Hall of Famers took on The League of Nations after they had defeated The New Day and proclaimed "No three people can ever defeat us." Foley brought out Mr. Socko and executed the Mandible Claw two times during the fight, once on Sheamus and once on King Barrett. The latter was part of a three-way finishing move sequence where Barrett was first hit with Sweet Chin Music by Shawn Michaels, staggered and fell into Mr. Socko, and finally hit with a Stone Cold Stunner.

Raw General Manager (2016–2017) 

On the July 18, 2016 episode of Raw, Foley was appointed by Stephanie McMahon as the general manager of Raw. Foley has since unveiled new titles exclusive to the Raw brand, while also making fair decisions to favor the faces and occasionally disagreeing with Stephanie McMahon. One of Foley's first decisions as Raw General Manager was pitting the feuding Sheamus and Cesaro against one another in a Best of 7 series. Going into Clash of Champions the duo were tied 3-3. At Clash of Champions, both men would be counted out resulting in a draw and the best of seven series being declared a draw. On the next night's episode of Raw Foley who had promised the victor a championship opportunity would put the two in a tag team. They would later lose to The New Day in a WWE Tag Team Championship match before capturing the RAW Tag Team Championships against the New Day at the Roadblock: End of the Line pay-per-view. On the November 21 episode of Raw, Foley would place Sami Zayn in a match against Braun Strowman after Zayn failed to defeat The Miz at Survivor Series for the WWE Intercontinental Championship to bring the title to Raw. During the match, Foley would order the match to be stopped, deeming Zayn unable to continue. The following week on Raw, Zayn would demand a rematch against Strowman, but Foley would decline, telling Zayn he could not beat him, making Zayn storm off in anger. On the December 12 episode of Raw, Zayn would once again ask for a rematch with Strowman but was once again rejected by Foley. Zayn would then tell Foley he was pondering going to SmackDown because Foley did not believe in him. Later that night, after Zayn defeated Jinder Mahal, Foley would tell him he has arranged a trade with SmackDown for him in exchange for Eva Marie. Zayn would angrily refuse the trade and once again demanded a rematch with Strowman. Foley would yield, giving Zayn his match with Strowman at Roadblock: End of the Line with a ten-minute time limit.

On the March 13, 2017 episode of Raw, Stephanie McMahon forced Foley to fire a member of the Raw roster by the end of the night. Foley chose to fire Stephanie McMahon herself, which prompted Triple H to come out and confront Foley. After being insulted and ordered to leave the ring, Foley instead attacked Triple H, stuffing a stinky sock in Triple H's mouth via Mr. Socko before being low blowed by McMahon. Seth Rollins would then come out to aid Foley, only to be attacked by Triple H. On the March 20 episode of Raw, Stephanie McMahon would fire Foley for his actions the previous week. A few weeks later Foley made an appearance at the WWE Hall of Fame class of 2017 ceremony.

Sporadic appearances (2018–present)
On the September 10, 2018 episode of Raw. Foley interrupted Elias with the announcement that in speaking with Stephanie McMahon regarding the upcoming 20th anniversary of his Hell in a Cell match with The Undertaker at King of the Ring that he would be appointed special guest referee for the WWE Universal Championship match between Roman Reigns and Braun Strowman at the September Hell in a Cell PPV event. At the event, Brock Lesnar would interfere in the contest with Paul Heyman spraying Foley in the eyes with pepper spray, as a result; the match was ruled a no-contest. Following the show, a Mick Foley 20 Years of Hell special was aired on the WWE Network. On the May 20, 2019 edition of Raw, Foley returned to unveil a new championship. He unveiled the 24/7 Championship announcing a scramble for the title. In July, he announced that he wanted to challenge R-Truth for the championship. However, that didn't occur due to being attacked by Bray Wyatt, now appearing as "The Fiend" on Raw.

Writing career 

Foley is a multi-time New York Times bestselling author, particularly known for his ongoing series of memoirs. His writing has generally received favorable reviews.

From May 7 to July 1, 1999, Foley wrote his autobiography – without the aid of a ghostwriter, as he noted in the introduction – in almost 800 pages of longhand. The book, Have a Nice Day: A Tale of Blood and Sweatsocks was released on October 31, 1999, and topped The New York Times non-fiction bestseller list for several weeks. The follow-up, Foley Is Good: And the Real World Is Faker than Wrestling, was released on May 8, 2001.

The third part of his autobiography, The Hardcore Diaries, highlights his 2004 feud with Randy Orton, his match and later partnership with Edge, and program with Ric Flair in 2006. The Hardcore Diaries was released on March 6, 2007 also spent time on the New York Times bestseller list. Foley's Countdown to Lockdown was released on October 1, 2010. On September 30, 2010, Joey Styles interviewed Foley on WWE.com – even though Foley was under contract with TNA – about his new book, while Michael Cole plugged the book on the edition of September 27 of Raw and a piece was published by Foley in Slate of which portions were adapted from Countdown. WWE's promotion of a product released by an employee of a rival company was a quite unusual move and a welcome surprise for Foley, who has since stated that he was delighted at the respect shown by his former employer. On November 10, 2010, Foley appeared on The Daily Show and Off the Record to discuss the book and his charity work. Countdown to Lockdown became Foley's first memoir to not make the New York Times bestseller list.

His fifth autobiography, Saint Mick, was released on October 17, 2017.

Foley has also written four children's books, Mick Foley's Halloween Hijinx, Mick Foley's Christmas Chaos, Tales from Wrescal Lane and A Most Mizerable Christmas, in addition to two novels: Tietam Brown, a coming-of-age story which was nominated for the WHSmith People's Choice Award in 2004 and Scooter, was published in August 2005.

 List of works 
 Memoirs
 (1999) Have a Nice Day: A Tale of Blood and Sweatsocks. ReganBooks. . (credited as Mankind/Mick Foley)
 (2001) Foley Is Good: And the Real World Is Faker than Wrestling. ReganBooks. .
 (2007) The Hardcore Diaries. PocketBooks. 
 (2010) Countdown to Lockdown: A Hardcore Journal. Grand Central Publishing. 
 (2017) Saint Mick: My Journey From Hardcore Legend to Santa's Jolly Elf . Polis Books. 
 Children's fiction
 (2000) Mick Foley's Christmas Chaos. ReganBooks. .
 (2001) Mick Foley's Halloween Hijinx. HarperCollins Publishers. .
 (2004) Tales From Wrescal Lane. World Wrestling Entertainment..
 (2012) A Most Mizerable Christmas DK Publishing, Inc..
 Contemporary fiction
 (2003) Tietam Brown. Knopf. .
 (2005) Scooter. Knopf. .

 Personal life 
Foley's father, former Ward Melville High School Athletic Director Jack Foley, died on September 13, 2009, at the age of 76.

Foley married his wife, Colette (née Christie), in 1992. They have three sons and a daughter: Dewey Francis (born February 20, 1992), Noelle Margaret (born December 15, 1993), Michael Francis "Mickey" Jr. (born 2001), and Hughie Francis (born 2003). As of June 2018, Dewey works for WWE, Noelle is a social media model and Mickey is on the autism spectrum. Mickey and Hughie operate their own YouTube channel, MickeyFoley0105. Foley himself occasionally appears in Mickey's videos, including one parodying the 2010 LeBron James special The Decision in which Foley teases announcing Al Snow as being his WWE Hall of Fame inductee before announcing the real inductee, Terry Funk.

Foley is a longtime fan of women's professional wrestling and has campaigned for their equality with men.

Foley is a supporter of the Stony Brook Seawolves college basketball team and frequently attended home games. Foley's father taught at Stony Brook University's school of professional development.

 Film, television and radio 

One of Foley's earliest acting roles was in 1996. Shortly before he joined the WWF, Foley appeared in Atlanta filmmakers Barry Norman and Michael Williams' short subject Deadbeats as "Bird", an armed robber turned debt collector. One of Foley's first TV guest appearances was as a wrestler on USA Network's short-lived action-comedy G vs E. He also featured prominently in the documentary Beyond the Mat. As Mankind, he also starred in a series of commercials for Chef Boyardee's beef ravioli. He appeared in the Insane Clown Posse vehicle Big Money Hustlas as Cactus Sac, which was the same character as his Cactus Jack persona.

In late 2001, Foley hosted a series of Robot Wars dubbed "Extreme Warriors." He also provided a guest voice for two episodes of the Nickelodeon animated series Avatar: The Last Airbender, in which he portrayed a satirical earthbending wrestler named The Boulder, and provided the voice for Gorrath in the pilot episode of Megas XLR. Foley appeared in an episode of Boy Meets World as Mankind, advising to Eric Matthews before giving Eric the mandible claw and an airplane spin. Foley was also a voice in an episode of Celebrity Deathmatch where he was an animated version of Mankind doing a stunt from the ceiling, and later in the same episode he fought and defeated Ernest Hemingway. Foley also had a small role in the 2007 thriller movie Anamorph starring Willem Dafoe.

Foley has frequently appeared on Air America Radio's Morning Sedition, including several stints as a guest host and has appeared on The Rachel Maddow Show. He also hosted WWE's radio show. Foley also occasionally appears on the Opie and Anthony Show. He appeared in the 2009 wrestling documentary, Bloodstained Memoirs.

In 2009, Foley had a guest voice appearance on Adult Swim show Squidbillies as Thunder Clap, a former pro-wrestler (strongly resembling Hulk Hogan in appearance and speech), who had recently gone through some tough times, during the Season 4 episode "Anabolic-holic". On August 22, 2009, Foley made his stand-up debut at The Improv in Los Angeles. The event was billed the "Total Xtreme Comedy show" and also featured comedians Brad Williams, Bret Ernst and Ring of Honor's Colt Cabana, who was also making his stand-up debut. The money Foley made from the event went to Wrestler's Rescue, which creates awareness and helps raise money to support retired professional wrestlers' health care needs. In October 2009, Foley was guest DJ on E Street Radio, a Satellite radio station dedicated to the music of Bruce Springsteen.

On November 19, 2009, Foley made his first appearance on The Daily Show with Jon Stewart. Deemed the "Senior Ass Kicker", Foley defended the pro-gay rights views of Will Phillips. He showed up again on March 15, 2010, to help correspondent Wyatt Cenac compare politics to pro wrestling, giving speeches for and against the use of the filibuster. Due to his charitable work and for standing up for Will Phillips, Foley was awarded a "Medal of Reasonableness" by Jon Stewart at the 2010 Rally to Restore Sanity and/or Fear.Itzkoff, Dave, "Live Blog: At the Rally to Restore Sanity and/or Fear", The New York Times, October 30, 2010, 3:00 pm ET. Retrieved October 31, 2010. On June 18, 2013, Foley again appeared on the Daily Show now hosted by temporary host John Oliver. On this appearance, he defended immigration reform in response to the WWE's character Zeb Colter's comments on the June 17 episode of Raw.

In mid-2010, Foley appeared at Chicago Comic Con, where he had his own booth promoting TNA. He was also interviewed by Victory Records, mentioning his interest in Swedish hard rock band Sister Sin.

On September 27, 2010, it was announced that Union Square Agency and American Original would be producing a feature film based on Foley's life.

In November 2010, Foley was a contestant on an all TNA week of Family Feud, teaming with Jay Lethal, Matt Morgan, Mr. Anderson and Rob Van Dam against Angelina Love, Christy Hemme, Lacey Von Erich, Tara and Velvet Sky.

Foley and his family appeared on ABC's Celebrity Wife Swap on January 31, 2012. His wife Colette traded places on the show with Antonio Sabàto, Jr.'s fiancé, Cheryl Moana Marie Nunes.

Foley appeared in a CollegeHumor video entitled "Mick Foley Mystery" as himself.

In 2014, a documentary starring Foley was released by Virgil Films entitled, I Am Santa Claus. The film was produced by Foley and Morgan Spurlock. It chronicles the lives of members of the Fraternal Order of Real Bearded Santas.

In 2018, Foley's infatuation for all things Christmas was documented in musical form with the song Mandible Claus by the B+ Players

Foley had a small role as a wrestling referee in the 2019 film The Peanut Butter Falcon.

 Filmography 

 Film 

 Television Video Games Activism 

Much of Foley's charitable work revolves around children. Among his involvement, Foley has volunteered with "Camp Adventure" helping kids coping with cancer, has participated in numerous Make-a-Wish Foundation events, has made surprise visits to children in hospitals, and has visited schools and libraries to talk to students about the value of education and the importance of reading. Foley sponsors seven children with ChildFund International (formerly Christian Children's Fund), a group he has been affiliated with since 1992. In recent years, he has become one of the fund's leading donors, helping fund childhood education centers in the remote areas of the Philippines and Mexico, as well as four small community schools in the West African nation of Sierra Leone. After visiting the country in November 2008, an experience he called "one of the best experiences of my life; maybe the best," Foley committed to funding a larger primary school, which was completed in September 2009.

Foley has visited U.S. troops at various military bases and military hospitals. For several years Foley visited wounded soldiers at Washington D.C.-based military hospitals on almost a monthly basis, becoming known as a "Legend among hurt troops," according to a Washington Times article.

Having become a devoted fan of Tori Amos' music in 1993, (particularly the song "Winter" from the Little Earthquakes album), and following a meeting with Amos at the 2008 San Diego Comic Con, Foley became involved with the Rape, Abuse & Incest National Network (RAINN), a group Amos co-founded in 1994. Since then, he has worked as a volunteer on their online hotline and as a member of their National Leadership Council. During a 15-month period ending in April 2011, Foley logged more than 550 hours talking to victims online. The same month, Foley offered to mow anyone's lawn who donated at least $5,000 to the organization, stating, "If you want to help survivors of sexual assault, or just want to see a big guy with long hair mowing your lawn in front of your friends, please take part..."

Continuing his campaign for the organization, in May 2011, Foley auctioned off on eBay two famous items associated with his wrestling career: his Cactus Jack lace-up "leopard skin" boots (still embedded with 149 thumbtacks from his Impact match with Ric Flair); and the white shirt that he wore as Mankind during 1998's "Hell in a Cell" match, among other items.

Foley has been outspoken in his support for the Democratic Party. During the 2004 election cycle, Foley argued the Democratic point of view in a WWE-sponsored debate against John "Bradshaw" Layfield, who spoke for the Republican side. He was a contributor to Barack Obama's campaign for the U.S. presidency in 2008.

 Championships and accomplishments 
 Cauliflower Alley Club Art Abrams Lifetime Achievement Award (2011)
 Continental Wrestling Association CWA Tag Team Championship (1 time) – with Gary Young 
 Extreme Championship Wrestling ECW World Tag Team Championship (2 times) – with Mikey Whipwreck
 George Tragos/Lou Thesz Professional Wrestling Hall of Fame Frank Gotch Award (2010)
 International Wrestling Association of Japan IWA World Tag Team Championship (1 time) – with Tracy Smothers
 King of the Deathmatch (1995)Memphis Wrestling Hall of FameClass of 2018
 Mid-South Championship Wrestling North American Championship (3 times)
 North American Wrestling NAW Heavyweight Championship (1 time)
 National Wrestling League NWL Heavyweight Championship (1 time)
 Ozark Mountain Wrestling OMW North American Heavyweight Championship (1 time)
 Pro Wrestling Illustrated Inspirational Wrestler of the Year (1993)
 Match of the Year (1998) 
 Match of the Year (1999) 
 Ranked No. 19 of the top 500 singles wrestlers in the PWI 500 in 1999
 Ranked No. 46 of the 500 best singles wrestlers of the PWI Years in 2003Professional Wrestling Hall of Fame Class of 2017
 Setup Thailand Pro Wrestling Setup 24/7 Championship (1 time)
 Steel City Wrestling SCW Heavyweight Championship (1 time)
 SCW Tag Team Championship (1 time) – with The Blue Meanie
 Suffolk Sports Hall of Fame Class of 1999 (Wrestling category)
 Total Nonstop Action Wrestling TNA Legends Championship (1 time)
 TNA World Heavyweight Championship (1 time)
 World Championship Wrestling WCW World Tag Team Championship (1 time) – with Kevin Sullivan
 World Class Championship Wrestling / United States Wrestling Association USWA World Tag Team Championship (1 time) – with Scott Braddock
 WCWA World Light Heavyweight Championship (1 time)
 WCWA World Tag Team Championship (2 times) – with Super Zodiak II (1) and Scott Braddock (1)
 World Wrestling Federation/WWE WWF Championship (3 times)
 WWF Hardcore Championship (1 time) 
 WWF Tag Team Championship (8 times) – with Stone Cold Steve Austin (1), Chainsaw Charlie (1), Kane (2), The Rock (3) and Al Snow (1)
 Tag Team Royal Rumble (1998)  – with Kane
 WWE Hall of Fame (Class of 2013)
 Slammy Award (1 time)
 Loose Screw (1997)
 Wrestling Observer Newsletter'' Best Brawler (1991–2000)
 Best on Interviews (1995, 2004, 2006)
 Best Pro Wrestling Book (2010) for Countdown to Lockdown
 Feud of the Year (2000) vs. Triple H
 Most Disgusting Promotional Tactic (1993) – Cactus Jack amnesia angle
 Readers' Favorite Wrestler (1998)
 Wrestling Observer Newsletter Hall of Fame (Class of 2000)Other championships'''
Tri-Cities Tag Team Championships (1 time) – with Shane Douglas

References 

General sources

Further reading 
 
 
 
 Mick Foley Radio Interview

External links 

 
 
 
 

1965 births
21st-century American comedians
21st-century American male writers
21st-century American novelists
American children's writers
American male non-fiction writers
American male novelists
American male professional wrestlers
21st-century American memoirists
American people of Irish descent
American stand-up comedians
ECW World Tag Team Champions
Living people
Masked wrestlers
New York (state) Democrats
Novelists from Indiana
Professional wrestlers from New York (state)
Professional wrestling authority figures
Professional Wrestling Hall of Fame and Museum
Professional wrestling managers and valets
Professional wrestling referees
TNA World Heavyweight/Impact World Champions
TNA Legends/Global/Television/King of the Mountain Champions
Sexual abuse victim advocates
State University of New York at Cortland alumni
ECW Originals members
The Stud Stable members
Ward Melville High School alumni
WWE Champions
WWE Hall of Fame inductees
WWF/WWE Hardcore Champions
20th-century professional wrestlers
21st-century professional wrestlers
USWA World Tag Team Champions
WCW World Tag Team Champions